Kagoshima Green Tea  is grown in Kagoshima Prefecture, the second largest producer of unprocessed tea after Shizuoka Prefecture. A lot of Kagoshima Green Tea is known as blended tea for other places of production, but it is getting famous as its own brand with more rigorous standards these days. The name, Kagoshima Green Tea, has been used since about 1992.

Production
The largest cultivation area of tea which is around the Nansatsu plateau ranging from Minami-Kyushu City to Makurazaki account for 40% of the total cultivation area of tea in Kagoshima. Other important areas are around Kagoshima, from Satsuma town to Kirishima and from Shibushi to Soo.

History
The chief priest from Uji started growing tea at temple in Yoshimatsu, Kagoshima.(1319 – 1320)
This is the first time to grow tea in Kagoshima.

In the Edo period (1603 – 1867), Satsuma clan encouraged tea cultivation so many people started growing tea at each place in Satsuma Province. At that time, the northern part of Kagoshima, from Akune to Yoshimatsu, was the center of tea plantations.
Tea was mainly grown at ridges between rice fields and hedges.

While opening up the country, the cultivation for export became active and many tea plantations were cultivated. In the 19th century, production of inferior tea had been increasing so in 1887, an association of tea in Kagoshima was established for improvement in quality. From around the 1870s to 1950s, tea growers also tried to grow tea leaves for English tea but it did not take off.

Around 1975, production become full scale. But because name recognition of Kagoshima Green Tea was originally low, it was unacceptable to the market and it was all made for blends. Around 1985, the sales strategy as a regional brand was strengthened.

References
中原尚文　「鹿児島県における茶業の発達」　『シラス地域研究　第3号』　シラス地域研究会、1985年(Japanese)
南日本新聞社・静岡新聞社　『お茶最前線　鹿児島・静岡平成茶考』　南日本新聞開発センター、1999年、(Japanese)

External links
Green Tea of Kagoshima  http://www.kagoshima-cha.or.jp/english/

Agricultural Products & Processed Food of Kagoshima http://www3.pref.kagoshima.jp/foreign/english/profile/gaiyou/3c2.html#5

Green tea
Japanese tea